Greek ligatures are graphic combinations of the letters of the Greek alphabet that were used in medieval handwritten Greek and in early printing. Ligatures were used in the cursive writing style and very extensively in later minuscule writing. There were dozens of conventional ligatures. Some of them stood for frequent letter combinations, some for inflectional endings of words, and some were abbreviations of entire words.

History 
In early printed Greek from around 1500, many ligatures fashioned after contemporary manuscript hands continued to be used. Important models for this early typesetting practice were the designs of Aldus Manutius in Venice, and those of Claude Garamond in Paris, who created the influential Grecs du roi typeface in 1541. However, the use of ligatures gradually declined during the 17th and 18th centuries and became mostly obsolete in modern typesetting. The ου ligature is still occasionally used in decorative writing, while the  abbreviation has some limited usage in functions similar to the Latin ampersand (&). Another ligature that was relatively frequent in early modern printing is a ligature of Ο with ς (a small sigma inside an omicron) for a terminal ος.

It took on the function of a number sign for "6", having been visually conflated with the cursive form of the ancient letter digamma, which had this numeral function.

Computer encoding

In the modern computer encoding standard Unicode, the abbreviation  has been encoded since version 3.0 of the standard (1999). An uppercase version  was added in version 5.1 (2008). A lower and upper case "stigma", designed for its numeric use, is also encoded in Unicode. Letters derived from the ου ligature exist for use in Latin, and for Cyrillic, though not for Greek itself. Some attempts have been made at recreating typesetting with ligatures in modern computer fonts, either through Unicode-compliant OpenType glyph replacement, or with simpler but non-standardized methods of glyph-by-glyph encoding.

 Greek digraphs

 Latin and Cyrillic Ou digraphs

Example images

Other examples

See also
 iota adscript, which is written with a ligatured iota: 
 iota subscript, also written with a ligatured iota: 
 Tau-Rho
 Chi-Rho
 IX Monogram
 Orthographic ligature

References

External links

 
Typographic ligatures
Greek alphabet

de:Griechisches Alphabet#Ligaturen